The 1980–81 Tampa Bay Rowdies indoor season was the seventh indoor season of the club's existence.

Overview
The 1980–81 indoor season was the Tampa Bay Rowdies' seventh season of existence, and their seventh season of indoor play. As in previous years, all home games were played at the Bayfront Center in St. Petersburg, Florida. The Rowdies entered the season as the defending indoor champions. They finished the season second in the Eastern Division with a 9–9 record, but failed to qualify for the playoffs. Óscar Fabbiani led the club with 31 goals and 77 points, while Steve Wegerle was the team's assist leader with 20. For the first time in club history the Tampa Bay Rowdies did not qualify for the playoffs.

Club

Roster 
*emergency player

Management and technical staff 
 George W. Strawbridge, Jr., owner
 Chas Serednesky, Jr., general manager
 Gordon Jago , head coach 
 Keith Peacock, assistant coach
 Ken Shields, trainer
 Alfredo Beronda, equipment manager

Honors

Individual honors
East Region All-Star: Steve Wegerle

Regular season

Final standings
W = Wins, L = Losses, GB = Games Behind 1st Place, % = Winning Percentage, GF = Goals For, GA = Goals Against

Results

Statistics

Season scoring
GP = Games Played, G = Goals (worth 2 points), A = Assists (worth 1 point), Pts = Points

Season goalkeeping
Note: GP = Games played; Min = Minutes played; GA = Goals against; GAA = Goals against average; W = Wins; L = Losses

Player movement

In

Out

See also
 1980–81 NASL Indoor season
 1981 in American soccer
 Tampa Bay Rowdies (1975–1993)

References

External links
 1980–81 Rowdies stats
 1981 in American Soccer

Tampa Bay Rowdies
1980-81 indoor
Tampa Bay Rowdies (1975–1993) seasons
Tampa Bay Rowdies
Tampa Bay Rowdies
Tampa
Sports in St. Petersburg, Florida